William Henry Dean (6 February 1887 – 2 May 1949) was a British water polo player who competed in the 1920 Summer Olympics. He was a member of the British team, which won the gold medal.

See also
 Great Britain men's Olympic water polo team records and statistics
 List of Olympic champions in men's water polo
 List of Olympic medalists in water polo (men)

References

External links

 

1887 births
1949 deaths
British male water polo players
Water polo players at the 1920 Summer Olympics
Olympic water polo players of Great Britain
Olympic gold medallists for Great Britain
Olympic medalists in water polo
Medalists at the 1920 Summer Olympics
20th-century British people